Henry Barbour (fl. 1414), of Melcombe Regis, Dorset, was an English politician.

He was a Member (MP) of the Parliament of England for Melcombe Regis in April 1414.

References

Year of birth missing
Year of death missing
Members of the Parliament of England (pre-1707) for Melcombe Regis
English MPs April 1414